The 1929 George Washington Colonials football team was an American football team that represented George Washington University as an independent during the 1929 college football season. In their first season under head coach Jim Pixlee, the team compiled a 0–8 record.

Schedule

References

George Washington
George Washington Colonials football seasons
College football winless seasons
George Washington Colonials football